A rotary table is a mechanical device on a drilling rig that provides clockwise (as viewed from above) rotational force to the drill string to facilitate the process of drilling a borehole. Rotary speed is the number of times the rotary table makes one full revolution in one minute (rpm).

Components
The rotary table is also called a turntable. Most rotary tables are chain driven. These chains resemble very large bicycle chains. The chains require constant oiling to prevent burning and seizing. Virtually all rotary tables are equipped with a rotary lock'. Engaging the lock can either prevent the rotary from turning in one particular direction, or from turning at all. This is commonly used by crews in lieu of using a second pair of tongs to makeup or break out pipes. The rotary bushings are located at the center of the rotary table. These can generally be removed in two separate pieces to facilitate large items, e.g. drill bits, to pass through the rotary table. The large gap in the center of the rotary bushings is referred to as the "bowl" due to its appearance. The bowl is where the slips are set to hold up the drill string during connections and pipe trips as well as the point the drill string passes through the floor into the wellbore. The rotary bushings connect to the kelly bushings to actually induce the spin required for drilling.

Alternatives
Most recently manufactured rigs no longer feature rotary drives. These newer rigs have opted for top drive technology. In top drive, the drill string is turned by mechanisms located in the top drive that is attached to the blocks. There is no need for the swivel because the top drive does all the necessary actions. The top drive does not eliminate the kelly bar and the kelly bushings.

See also
 Drilling rig (petroleum) for a detailed description of the diagram.

External links
 Rotary table in Oilfield Glossary

Oilfield terminology
Drilling technology